Bolivar is a station on 7bis of the Paris Métro in the 19th arrondissement. It is named after the nearby avenue Simon Bolivar, which is turn was named after Simón Bolívar (1783–1830), liberator of several South American countries.

History
The station opened on 18 July 1911, 6 months the opening of a branch of line 7 from Louis Blanc to Pré Saint-Gervais on 18 January 1911. On 3 December 1967 this branch was separated from line 7, becoming line 7bis.

During the World War I, the station, like other deep metro stations was converted into an air raid shelter. During a violent bomb attack on 11 March 1918, the local population rushed to the shelter in panic and tried to enter it down the stairs of an exit that led to gates that only opened to the outside. The first rows of the crowd were crushed or suffocated by those behind them, and were eventually trampled when the doors finally broke under pressure. 76 people died in this incident. As a result, all gates on the métro are now designed to open inwards as well as outwards.

As part of the "Un métro + beau" programme by the RATP, the station was renovated and modernised with the corridors being completed in 16 December 2008 and its platforms in 2009.

In 2019, the station was used by 546,780  passengers, making it the 298th busiest of the Métro network out of 302 stations.

In 2020, the station was used by 278,933 passengers amidst the COVID-19 pandemic, making it the 296th busiest of the Métro network out of 305 stations.

Passenger services

Access 
The station has a single entrance at the corner of avenue Secrétan and avenue Simon-Bolivar. Since 1987, it was adorned with a Guimard entrance previously at Barbès–Rochechouart and was listed as a historical monument on 2 December 2016.

Station layout

Platforms 
Bolivar has a standard configuration with 2 tracks surrounded by 2 side platforms. The platform in the direction of Louis Blanc had a small exhibit that paid homage to the life of Simón Bolívar through an illustrated biography on the walls but was removed during the renovation of the station.

Other connections 
The station is also served by line 26 of the RATP bus network.

Nearby 

 Halle Secrétan

Gallery

References

Paris Métro line 7bis
Paris Métro stations in the 19th arrondissement of Paris
Railway stations in France opened in 1911